International Service Learning, founded in 1996, is a non-governmental organization that offers medical volunteers two to three week placements in twelve countries: Belize, Colombia, Costa Rica,  Cuba, Dominican Republic, Haiti, Jamaica, Mexico, Nicaragua, Panama, Peru, and Tanzania. The company is led by Jonathan Birnbaum, executive director, in Spokane, Washington.

Volunteers participate on nine to fourteen day trips that are self-funded.

References

External links 
 

Companies established in 1996
Companies based in Spokane, Washington
1996 establishments in Washington (state)